Wingersheim-les-Quatre-Bans is a commune in the Bas-Rhin department of northeastern France. The municipality was established on 1 January 2016 and consists of the former communes of Gingsheim, Hohatzenheim, Mittelhausen and Wingersheim.

See also 
Communes of the Bas-Rhin department

References 

Communes of Bas-Rhin